Strejești is a commune in Olt County, Oltenia, Romania. It is composed of four villages: Colibași, Mamura, Strejești and Strejeștii de Sus.

References

Communes in Olt County
Localities in Oltenia